Bhogeswar Baruah (Assamese: ভোগেশ্বৰ বৰুৱা; born 3 September 1940) is an Indian former-athlete and coach. He was one of the first Assamese to win gold at an international event, winning a He gold medal in an 800-metre running event of at the 1966 Asian Games. He also won a silver medal in the 4 x 400 metres relay in the 1970 Asian games. He is a recipient of the Arjuna Award and is the first Assamese to obtain the Arjuna award.

Baruah was born on 3 September 1940. He came from a farmer's family, and was very poor while growing up in Sivasagar. Baruah enjoyed sports from a young age, particularly football. He joined the Indian Defence Force in 1960, which led to him focusing on running rather than football.

Baruah began his early running career shortly after his entry into the army. He participated in several running events, winning gold in numerous events. In 1965, in the National Athletics Competition held in Bangalore, he set a national record finishing the 800 metre race in 1 min 49.9 seconds. In the 1966 Asian Games he won gold by running the 800 metres in 1 minute 49.4 seconds, which set a new record in Asia. In the 1970 Asian Games, he won a silver medal in a 4 x 400 metre relay.

Baruah's birthday is celebrated on 3 September every year in Assam, which was named the "Abhiruchi Sports Day" in his honor. He also started a sports academy at Dimow in Sivasagar in the early 1990s. But after operating for three years, he had closed it down due to lack of funds.  Baruah is considered a sporting icon and household name in Assam.

Early life and military career 
Bhogeswar Baruah was born on 3 September 1940 in Sundarpur in Joyasagar in the Sibasagar district. His father was Bhodraswar Baruah and his mother was Aikon Baruah. Baruah had 7 siblings and was the 6th child out of the 8 siblings. Baruah came from a poor family and his father, the late Bhodraswar Baruah, was uneducated and the economic condition of his family was not good enough to maintain his outfit.

Baruah spent the early years of his colourful life in Sivasagar. Baruah was initially attracted to football, however he also enjoyed boxing and swimming as well as several other sports.

Baruah joined the EME department of the Indian Defence Force in 1960. The course of his life gradually changed after joining the department because he gradually began to focus on running instead of football.

Sporting career

Early career 
Baruah participated in the All India Open Athletics Meet Relay in New Delhi. Baruah managed to win gold in the relay.

Baruah participated in the 400 metre and 800 metre race at the Open Athletics held in Sri Lanka in 1964. He again won gold in this event.

In 1964, Baruah participated in the National Athletic Competition held in Chandigarh and in 1965, he participated in the National Athletic Competition held in Bangalore. Notably, he also won a gold medal in these 1964-1965 events. He however not only managed to win gold, but in the 1965 event, Baruah set a national record by finishing the 800 metre race in 1 min 49.9 seconds.

Asian games 
In 1966, Baruah managed to bring glory to Assam and the North East, by winning gold in the 1966 Asian Games held in Bangkok in the 800 metres athletics event. Baruah finished in 1 minute 49.4 seconds, which set a new record in Asia by in that time. Not only did Baruah win a gold medal, but he also became the first Assamese to win gold at an international level.

In 1970, Baruah was part of the Indian team that won silver at the 1970 Asian Games in the 400 metre relay.

Baruah also was one of the athletes who carried a torch in a relay in the opening of the 2016 South Asian Games.

Later career 
After his retirement from the Indian Army, Baruah found it difficult to maintain his family of five and had to take up the job of a driver in Sibsagar.

Later on, the Assamese sports magazine, Abhiruchi, brought his state to the notice of people and also wrote a letter to the President of India.

As a reaction, ONGC elevated him to the post of Regional Sports Officer in 1983. The Government also sanctioned a petrol pump in his name at Numaligarh later.

Contributions to the sporting world 
Baruah established a sports academy in Dimow in Sibasagar in the early 90s. Through the academy, Baruah shared his experiences and started training the younger generations interested in sports. However, after three years, the academy was shut down due the lack of funding.

In 2019, Chief Minister Sarbananda Sonowal laid the foundation stone of Bhogeswar's state sports school at the Sports Complex in Guwahati's Sarusajai. The school which is the first of its kind in the state will be built at a sprawling 20 bigha of land where theoretical and practical coaching will be provided at six prescribed sports (athletics, boxing, association football, weightlifting, archery and taekwondo). Sonowal said that sport is a tool through which peace can be brought in society. Sonowal announced that the government would formulate a policy to integrate it with culture and education so that sportspersons pursuing training are not deprived of academic and moral values. After stating that sport is the way to become energetic and fit, Sonowal urged upon the sporting talents to be disciplined, dedicated and hard working. He also said that to develop quality in the sporting ambience in the state, the Assam Government decided to set up Sports University at Chabua in Dibrugarh district, a Sports College in Kokrajhar and Sports School in Guwahati so that the  sporting talents of the state could be properly nurtured. Bhogeswar Baruah was present during the occasion and said that he was happy to see a sports institute after his name. "Definitely, it's a happy feeling for me. I hope the school will help in nurturing a host of young talents who will be able to represent the country in the long run."

Baruah also served as the brand ambassador of Khel Sivasagar Khel of a sports initiative planned under the Soulful Sivasagar campaign adopted by Sivasagar DC M.S Lakshmipriya in 2020.

Legacy 
Baruah has been praised for being the first player to receive gold at a national level. Balendra Mohan Chakravarty said "Baruah is the greatest sportsperson Assam has ever produced. He is a pioneer too, being the first athlete from Assam to bring a gold medal for the country from an international meet." A biography of Baruah concluded that he has been able to achieve success by acknowledging a lot of hardship and sacrifice by showing his skills through concentration and perseverance which has made him an icon for the new generation. The biography also stated that Baruah's hard life struggle proved that having duty, courage concentration intelligence and determination to reach the goal cannot hinder any factor from moving forward. The biography said that Assam will always be proud of Arjun Bhogeswar Baruah's achievement as an Assamese.

Baruah himself considers the best compliment to be from Milkha Singh in 1986 in which Singh said "you are very lucky. I am called the Flying Sikh, but I doubt even my neighbours know when my birthday is. And here in Assam, your birthday is celebrated with so much grandeur. I really envy you."

On the 36th Abhiruchi Sports day, Chief Minister Sarbananda Sonowal said on Twitter:
In 2021, the Assam government under Chief Minister Himanta Biswa Sarma announced that Baruah's birthday would be celebrated as sports day in Assam. On 3 September 2021, at the Sports Pension Awards Ceremony, Baruah was one of the 13 recipients which Sarma formally handed over pension sanction letters to. Governor Jagadish Mukhi and ministers Bimal Bora and Parimal Suklabadiya were also present at the ceremony. Sarma said that Baruah's life and achievement would continue to inspire upcoming generations.

Honors and awards 
Over Baruah's career, he has received numerous awards:

 Arjuna Award (1966)
 Lachit Award (2015)
 Bir Chilarai Award (2019), presented by Chief Minister Sarbanada Sonowal

Books featuring Bhogeswar Baruah 

 Golden Race: Bhogeswar Baruah's autobiography, (2019), a biography written by Narayan Bordoloi

See also 

 List of Arjuna Award recipients (1961–1969)
 List of National Sports Award recipients in athletics

References 

Athletes from Assam
People from Sivasagar district
Indian sports coaches
Indian male middle-distance runners
Recipients of the Arjuna Award
Asian Games gold medalists for India
Asian Games silver medalists for India
1940 births
Asian Games medalists in athletics (track and field)
Athletes (track and field) at the 1966 Asian Games
Athletes (track and field) at the 1970 Asian Games
Living people
Medalists at the 1966 Asian Games
Medalists at the 1970 Asian Games